Iulian Teodosiu (born 30 September 1994) is a Romanian sabre fencer, winning a team silver medal in the 2013 World Fencing Championships.

Career
Teodosiu took up fencing at the age of 9 after coaches from his local club, CSS Slobozia, came at his school to do a presentation. He describes this first contact as “love at first sight”. Teodosiu practiced sabre along with future teammate Alin Badea under coaches Marin Mihăiță and Marius Pușcașu.

Teodosiu joined the national team at the age of 18, after the 2012 Summer Olympics, when three of its four members retired from sport. His first competition with the team was the Madrid World Cup, where Romania earned a bronze medal. Mădălin Bucur was selected in his place for the 2013 European Fencing Championships in Zagreb, but head coach Mihai Covaliu called him back as reserve for the World Championships in Budapest. In the individual event, he was eliminated in the table of 64 by Valery Pryiemka of Belarus. In the team event, Romania defeated Australia, then Poland, and hosts Hungary to meet Belarus in the semi-final. Teodosiu entered the piste on 30-24 for Belarus and defeated Aliaksei Likhacheuski 11–4 to give his team the lead. Romania finally prevailed 45–44. In the final against Russia, Teodosiu lost 5–7 his first relay against Nikolay Kovalev, as well his second, with 4–6 against newly crowned World champion Veniamin Reshetnikov. Romania were defeated 45–38 and took the silver medal.

Teodosiu joined CS Dinamo in the 2013–14 season. With his new club he won the European Champion Clubs' Cup in Gödöllő, closing the final against Hungary's Vasas SC after his captain Tiberiu Dolniceanu was injured. In the European Championships in Strasbourg, Teodosiu lost in the table of 64 against Hungary's Tamás Decsi. In the team event, Romania met Belarus in the quarter-finals. Teodosiu entered the last leg on 40–42 to replace injured Alin Badea. He could not prevent Aliaksandr Buikevich from closing 45–41. Romania then entered the placement rounds and defeated Ukraine and Hungary to finish No.5. In the World Championships in Kazan, Teodosiu was eliminated in the table of 64 by Veniamin Reshetnikov. In the team event, Romania met Olympic champion South Korea in the quarter-finals. Teodosiu gave his team an early lead, which he later consolidated against Won Woo-young, but Romania were eventually defeated 45–41 and finished 7th after the placement rounds.

He won one of the bronze medals in the men's sabre event at the 2022 World Fencing Championships held in Cairo, Egypt.

Teodosiu graduated from National College Mihai Viteazul in Slobozia. He studies psychology.

References

External links
Profile  at the European Fencing Confederation

1994 births
Living people
Romanian male fencers
Romanian sabre fencers
People from Slobozia
Fencers at the 2015 European Games
European Games medalists in fencing
European Games silver medalists for Romania
Fencers at the 2020 Summer Olympics
Olympic fencers of Romania
World Fencing Championships medalists
20th-century Romanian people
21st-century Romanian people